John Thomas Wheatley, Baron Wheatley,  (17 January 1908 – 28 July 1988) was a Scottish Labour politician and judge.

Biography 
Wheatley was born on 17 January 1908 in Shettleston, Glasgow, the third and youngest child of Janet (1877–1951), a pupil teacher and daughter of Peter Murphy, a labourer from Belfast, and Patrick Wheatley (1875–1937), sometime miner and later publisher, who was born in County Waterford. He was educated at St. Aloysius' College, Glasgow, Mount St Mary's College near Sheffield, and the University of Glasgow. He was admitted as an advocate in 1932.

He served in the Royal Artillery and the Judge Advocate Generals' Branch during World War II. As an advocate, he appeared before the Court of Session in his military uniform. As a young man he played football for Shettleston F.C.

He was an unsuccessful parliamentary candidate for Bute and North Ayrshire in 1945 and for Glasgow Bridgeton in 1946, where he was defeated by the Independent Labour Party candidate. He was elected for Edinburgh East at a by-election in November 1947 and sat for the constituency until 1954.  During his time in the Commons, he never made a Maiden Speech.

He was Solicitor General for Scotland from March to October 1947, when he was appointed Lord Advocate. He was appointed a King's Counsel (KC) and a Privy Counsellor (PC) in 1947. One of his most significant achievements as a politician was the establishment of the legal aid scheme in Scotland. He was appointed to the bench, with the judicial title Lord Wheatley. In 1963, he heard the notorious divorce case of Ian Campbell, 11th Duke of Argyll.  He granted the Duke a divorce and, in his written opinion, was harshly critical of the Duchess.  In 1966 he was appointed chairman of the Royal Commission on Local Government in Scotland.

The resulting "Wheatley Report", published in 1969, led to the eventual introduction a new system of Scottish local authorities. On 28 July 1970 he was created a life peer, as Baron Wheatley, of Shettleston in the County of the City of Glasgow. In December 1972 he was appointed to succeed Lord Grant as Lord Justice Clerk,
a post he held until 1985.

Following the Ibrox disaster in 1971, Wheatley was appointed by the government to conduct an inquiry into safety at sports grounds. His 1972 report became the basis for the Green Guide.

Wheatley was a lifelong Roman Catholic. He was also known for hard sentencing of crimes involving sex. While Lord Justice-Clerk (an appeal judge), he exercised his right to sit as a trial judge in criminal cases, and handed out long sentences for such crimes.

Posthumous
It was Wheatley's memorial service in 1988 which was attended by his old friend Lord Mackay of Clashfern, at the time Lord Chancellor. As a member of the Free Presbyterian Church of Scotland, which strongly disapproves of Roman Catholicism, Mackay was disciplined by his church for having attended the memorial service.

Family
His uncle was the Shettleston MP John Wheatley, minister of housing in the 1924 Labour government. Wheatley married Nancy Nichol in 1935. The couple had four sons and a daughter. Wheatley's son-in-law was Tam Dalyell, former father of the House of Commons, who married Wheatley's daughter, Kathleen, in 1963.

References

External links
 

1908 births
1988 deaths
Politicians from Glasgow
Place of death missing
Solicitors General for Scotland
Wheatley
Scottish Roman Catholics
Royal Artillery officers
Alumni of the University of Glasgow
Members of the Privy Council of the United Kingdom
Life peers
Scottish Labour MPs
Members of the Parliament of the United Kingdom for Edinburgh constituencies
UK MPs 1945–1950
UK MPs 1950–1951
UK MPs 1951–1955
UK MPs who were granted peerages
British Army personnel of World War II
People educated at St Aloysius' College, Glasgow
Lord Advocates
Scottish King's Counsel
20th-century King's Counsel
Ministers in the Attlee governments, 1945–1951
Life peers created by Elizabeth II